Ellie Baker (born 3 June 1998) is a British athlete specialising in the 800 metres and 1500 metres. She won silver medals in the 800 m at the 2019 European Under-23 Championships and 2017 European U20 Championships.

Baker competed for Great Britain in the 800 m at the 2021 European Indoor Championships in Toruń, Poland, and the 2022 World Championships held in Eugene, Oregon.

In February 2023, the 24-year-old claimed a maiden national title, winning the 1500 m at the British Indoor Championships with a time of 4:06.73 and breaking Zola Budd's 1986 championship record in the process.

Personal life
Ellie Baker was raised in Borehamwood, Hertfordshire in the United Kingdom. She has two siblings and attended Townsend Church of England School in St. Albans. Baker first started running competitively for Herts Phoenix Athletic Club before joining Shaftesbury Barnet Harriers.

References

External links

1998 births
Living people
British female middle-distance runners
Place of birth missing (living people)